The Camel Nunataks are two similar rock nunataks rising to ,  apart, and  north of View Point and 8.68 km northwest of Garvan Point, Trinity Peninsula. The name is descriptive and has been in use amongst Falkland Islands Dependencies Survey personnel at Hope Bay since about 1959.

Map
 Trinity Peninsula. Scale 1:250000 topographic map No. 5697. Institut für Angewandte Geodäsie and British Antarctic Survey, 1996.

External links
 Camel Nunataks. Copernix satellite image

References 

Nunataks of Trinity Peninsula